Case analysis may refer to

 Proof by cases in mathematics
 Case study, detailed examination of a subject
 The case method used in teaching